The Guardian Angel Settlement Association is a non-sectarian, non-profit 501c3 in St. Louis, Missouri dedicated to empowering the disadvantaged through an array of programs which include family services, a food pantry, senior citizen support, and developmental childcare. Its mission  is "to serve those living in poverty by helping them improve the quality of their lives and become economically independent.".

The agency serves over 7,000 children, families and senior citizens each year through emergency services at its Hosea House location and with licensed, accredited child care at its Child Development Center.

History
Founded in 1859 by the Daughters of Charity of Saint Vincent de Paul, as an orphanage for young girls Guardian Angel Settlement Association is one of the longest-enduring charitable organizations in the St. Louis area.

In 1911, Guardian Angel Settlement Association became the first settlement house established by the Catholic Church.

In the 1910s Daisy E. Nirdlinger conducted business women's literary class.

In 1933, Guardian Angel Settlement Association became a member of United Charities, the forerunner of the United Way of Greater Saint Louis. It is now recognized as a charter member of the United Way and is one of its oldest member agencies.

In 1963, To make way for a new City park, the agency moves to the Darst-Webbe public housing project on Saint Louis’ Near South Side.

In 2001, Takes over the operations and management of Hosea House, a 25-year-old social agency.

In 2009, Agency celebrated 150th anniversary of serving the poor in St. Louis, August 31, 2009 with opening of new child development center.

In 2013, Guardian Angel Settlement Association established the Sr. Annalee Faherty, D.C. Service Endowment, the agency's first permanent fund.

References

External links
 http://www.gasastl.org/
 Better Business Review of Guardian Angel Settlement Association
 Guardian Angel Settlement Association GuideStar Profile
 Guardian Angel Settlement Association Charity Navigator Profile
 Guardian Angel Settlement Association VolunteerMatch Profile
 Guardian Angel Settlement Association LinkedIn
 Guardian Angel Settlement Association Facebook
 Greater St. Louis Federation of Settlement Houses and Neighborhood Centers
 Sr. Annalee Faherty, D.C. Service Endowment Established to Support Guardian Angel Settlement Association
 Guardian Angel Settlement Association Received Support from Ameren Missouri
 GASA opening $4 million center
 Guardian Angel Settlement marks 150 years with new child center
 Charity Auction Raises Over $208K to Support Emergency Services and New Endowment
 Tishaura Jones, City of St. Louis Treasurer Supports Guardian Angel Settlement Association
 Real-life 'angel' brings spirit of charity to agency's efforts

Organizations based in St. Louis
Organizations established in 1859
1859 establishments in Missouri